Brisbane Open House  is a Doors Open Days event held in Brisbane, Queensland, Australia that showcases many of the city's buildings to the public. Among the buildings included are historical landmarks, galleries, office buildings, museums, places of worship and bridges. Well known buildings not usually open to the public are open for free public tours. The annual event is usually held on the first weekend in October.

The event is organised by the Queensland Government Architect, the Brisbane Development Association, and the National Trust of Queensland.

Brisbane Open House is part of the Open House Worldwide annual cultural event.

History
The inaugural Brisbane Open House took place on 2 October 2010, and featured 20 buildings in the CBD and South Bank. More than 12,000 people attended. In 2011 the event expanded to 30 buildings and included Fortitude Valley. The 2012 event featured 51 buildings and attracted 33,000 visitors. The 2013 event expanded to 71 buildings presented over a two-day weekend. The 2014 event featured 89 buildings.

Due to  COVID-19 pandemic the events planned in 2020 and 2021 had been cancelled.

2016
The 2016 event expanded to 100 buildings with large number of new buildings open to the general public for the first time:
480 Queen Street
Brisbane Arts Theatre
Fort Lytton Historic Military Precinct
Moreton Club
Queensland State Archives
Sir Thomas Brisbane Planetarium 
Wacol Military Museum
Wolston House

2015
New buildings open to the general public for the first time were:
Archerfield Airport 
Brisbane GPO 
Princess Theatre
Queensland Emergency Operations Centre

Participating buildings

See also

Doors Open Days
Open House Melbourne

References

External links
Brisbane Open House Homepage
List of buildings open in 2012

Doors Open Days
Tourist attractions in Brisbane
Culture of Brisbane
Annual events in Brisbane
Recurring events established in 2010
October events
2010 establishments in Australia